The 2004 Miami Dolphins season was the team's 39th overall, and 35th as a member of the National Football League. The Dolphins were unable to improve upon their previous season's output of 10–6, instead only going 4–12 after starting the season 0–6. The team was adversely affected by the premature retirement of their star running back, Ricky Williams, and the trade of holdout defensive end Adewale Ogunleye for wide receiver Marty Booker, as well as career ending injuries to fullback Rob Konrad and defensive tackle Tim Bowens. With this season record below .500 the team would have their first losing season since 1988. To make matters worse, two of their games were postponed due to Hurricane Ivan and Hurricane Jeanne.

Despite the disappointing season, the Dolphins, at 2–11 were able to upset the defending and eventual Super Bowl champion 12–1 New England Patriots, a memorable game of the Dolphins-Patriots rivalry known as "The Night That Courage Wore Orange", and handed the Patriots their second loss of the season. During Week 6, their match with the Buffalo Bills is the only time in the NFL since 1968 that the last two winless teams have met each other.

Staff

Roster

Schedule

"The Night That Courage Wore Orange" 

On December 20, the 2–11 Dolphins upset the 12–1 defending and eventual Super Bowl champion Patriots on Monday Night Football by a score of 29–28. Late in the game, A. J. Feeley threw a game-winning touchdown to Derrius Thompson on 4th down and 10. Bleacher Report writer Thomas Galicia nicknamed the game "The Night That Courage Wore Orange".

Images

Standings

References 

Miami Dolphins seasons
Miami Dolphins
Miami Dolphins